Giggleswick is a railway station on the Bentham Line, which runs between  and  via . It is owned by Network Rail and managed by Northern Trains.

History
Opened by the "Little" North Western Railway in 1849, the station was originally known as "Settle", as it was the first station to serve the town, although situated some distance west of its centre.

The station did have more substantial buildings in the past, along with a goods yard, water tower and signal box. These were all demolished/removed after the station closed to goods traffic and was downgraded to unmanned halt status in 1970.

Stationmasters

Joseph Smith ca. 1862 - 1876 (station master at New Mills from 1879)
Richard Bentham 1876 - 1904
N.R.W. Leaton 1904 - 1908
Charles Frederick Robinson 1908 - ca. 1911
E.M. Jackson ca. 1914 - ca. 1927
Harry Pearson ca. 1928
W. Tinniswood 1933 - 1935 (afterwards station master at Kirkby Stephen East)

Facilities
The only buildings now provided here are standard waiting shelters - a new bespoke one was opened on the westbound platform in November 2016.  The two platforms are of differing construction - the westbound is wooden, whilst the eastbound equivalent is stone/concrete.  They are linked by a barrow crossing, so the station is fully step free (though the National Rail Enquiries service and Northern recommend that disabled passengers only use this with assistance).  Train running information provision is provided by posters, new information displays and a telephone link to the signal box at Settle Junction.  Tickets can only be bought on the train, as no ticketing facilities are available here (though operator Northern is planning to install one).

Service

Four trains ran each way on Sundays throughout the year since the May 2011 timetable change (an improvement on the former twice-daily winter frequency).

From the start of the May 2018 summer timetable, additional services have been introduced. Eight trains each way now run to Lancaster and Skipton, with five of the former continuing to Morecambe and seven of the latter to Leeds (though the direct train to and from Heysham has ceased on weekdays and Saturdays).  One additional train each way runs on Sundays. One additional train each way was introduced from 20 May 2019 on weekdays and Saturdays, with two additional trains running to and from Morecambe.  The winter 2019 timetable update has seen all five departures extended from Lancaster through to Morecambe, with one running right through to/from Heysham.

References

External links
 
 

Craven District
DfT Category F2 stations
Railway stations in North Yorkshire
Former Midland Railway stations
Railway stations in Great Britain opened in 1849
Northern franchise railway stations
1849 establishments in England